Opeka Manor  (also known as Bombelles Manor) is a castle in the Vinica municipality, Varaždin County, northern Croatia.

Located in the surrounding park with a large arboretum, the manor is situated below the Macelj forest in the northern part of Hrvatsko Zagorje historic region. It was founded in the 17th century by the Counts of Keglević and later owned by the Counts of Nadasdy, then Drašković and finally Bombelles (until 1945).

Today the manor is weathered and longs for renewal.

External links 

 Photos
 Opeka Manor
 Opeka manor and arboretum description
 History of Opeka manor
 History of manor and arboretum

Castles in Croatia
Ruined castles in Croatia
Buildings and structures in Varaždin County
Tourist attractions in Varaždin County